Dündarköy can refer to:

 Dündarköy, Karayazı
 Dündarköy, Orhaneli